Down Among the Dead Men may refer to:

In literature:
 Down Among the Dead Men, a 1954 story by William Tenn
 Down Among the Dead Men, a 1982 novelette by Gardner Dozois and Jack Dann
 Down Among the Dead Men, a 1993 book by Dave Morris
 Down Among the Dead Men a 1993 book, by Simon R. Green
 "Down Among the Dead Men", a 2004 storyline in The Sensational Spider-Man (vol. 2)
 Down Among the Dead Men, a 2010 novel by Robert Gregory Browne
 Down Among the Dead Men, a fictional book by the character Bernice Summerfield in the Dr. Who novels
 Down Among the Dead Men, a 1933 autobiography and essays  by composer Bernard van Dieren

In music:
 Down Among the Dead Men (band), a Swedish/Danish death metal musical project
 "Down Among the Dead Men" (song), a traditional song
 "Down Among the Dead Men", a song by Flash and the Pan from the 1979 album Flash and the Pan
 Down Among the Deadmen, a 2000 album by The Lord Weird Slough Feg

In television:
 "Down Among the Dead Men", an episode Diagnosis: Murder
 Down Among the Dead Men (Bugs), a 1999 episode
 "Down Among the Dead Men", a 2006 episode of Midsomer Murders

See also
Down Among the Z Men, a 1952 film